Carex ornithopoda, called the  bird's foot sedge, is a species of flowering plant in the genus Carex, native to most of Europe, and Anatolia. A variegated cultivar is commercially available.

Subtaxa
The following subspecies are currently accepted:
Carex ornithopoda subsp. ornithopoda
Carex ornithopoda subsp. ornithopodioides (Hausm.) Nyman

References

ornithopoda
Plants described in 1805